Dominic Old Scholars Association Soccer Club, often abbreviated to DOSA SC is a soccer club based in Glenorchy, Tasmania. The club is linked with the school Dominic College. While previously having competed at the highest levels available in Tasmania, the club currently plays in the social leagues in competitions run by the governing body Football Federation Tasmania. Its home ground is Tolosa Street.

External links
Official Website

Soccer clubs in Tasmania
Association football clubs established in 1989
1989 establishments in Australia